Midnight Sun Brewing Company (MSBC) is a craft brewery that produces over 40 different ales and lagers each year. Founded in 1995, it is Anchorage, Alaska's first brewery and the second oldest in state history, following Alaska Brewing Co. in 1986. The brewery has been in their current location since May 2009, with a tap-house and full-service restaurant. MSBC has won several awards for their beers, including medals from the Great American Beer Festival and the World Beer Cup. The brewery sells its beers in 12-oz cans, 22-oz bottles, 5 gallon kegs, and 64 oz growlers. Their U.S. distribution is limited to AK, WA, ID, OR, CA, HI, and NY.

History 
Mark Staples founded Midnight Sun Brewing Co. in 1995. Their original location on Arctic Boulevard shared an industrial space with Knight's Taxidermy, the business featured on reality television program, Mounted in Alaska. The brewery moved to its present location in South Anchorage in 2009, where it expanded brewery operations to 10,000 barrel capacity, increased customer seating, and began food service in The Loft. MSBC began pouring beer at Williwaw Social in downtown Anchorage in 2018, allowing patrons to enjoy more than the state-regulated 36oz pour limit imposed on Alaska breweries.

The brewery has been a regular participant in Anchorage's First Fridays art walk, with their own First Firkin Fridays, featuring the works of different local artists in The Loft, each month. Specially brewed casks of conditioned beer are opened by the guest artist at the event.

In 2016 the label art of Panty Peeler Belgian-Style Tripel Ale sparked attacks on social media which rose to the attention of national press. The World Beer Cup announced in 2017 that they would no longer accept entries which have 'sexist and lewd names', making Panty Peeler ineligible for both its label art and name. In 2009 Author Ben McFarland noted Panty Peeler as one of the best beers in the world.

Business Insider noted Midnight Sun Brewing Co. in 2017 as one of the top-rated brewers in the country, and Anchorage, AK as a "Top 10 Craft Beer City".

MSBC has supported the LGBT community by sponsoring and participating in local Pride Month events such as the Rainbow Run and Brewed with Pride, a collaboration of various breweries which release unique products during Pride Month to raise money and awareness for LGBT charities and issues. In 2019 MSBC released Stonewall Riot.

Inspiring competition 
Two long-time brewers, Gabe Fletcher and Ben Johnson, left MSBC to establish their own breweries. Head brewer Gabe Fletcher left the company in 2010 to form competitor Anchorage Brewing Company (ABC), which quickly emerged as an internationally awarded, critically acclaimed brewery. . ABC has already managed to achieve "Best Barleywine in the World 2017" with ABC's, A Deal With the Devil – an accomplishment which evolved from MSBC's top rated Arctic Devil Barleywine. Head brewer Ben Johnson, responsible for the creation of MSBC's Berserker Imperial Stout, left in 2011 to open Mumbai, India's first microbrewery. After several other projects and world travel, Johnson opened Carabao brewery in Guam in 2019.

Products 
The Arctic Rhino Coffee Porter and the Midnight Sun Brewing Co. was mentioned in a 2017 Lonely Planet book.

Awards 

Great America Beer Festival
 Bronze 2005 – Arctic Rhino Coffee Porter – Coffee flavored beer
 Bronze 2006 – Arctic Devil – Barley wine style
 Bronze 2006 – Arctic Rhino Coffee Porter – Coffee flavored beer
 Gold 2007 – Imperial Pumpkin Chocolate Porter (late named TREAT) – Experimental Ale
 Silver 2008 – Pride – Belgian & French Style Ale
World Beer Cup
 Bronze 2008 – Pride – Belgian / French
 Can Can Awards
 Silver 2016 – Panty Peeler – Belgian style ale
 Bronze 2017 – Panty Peeler – Belgian style ale

* Local AK Festival Wins Omitted

References

External links 
 Independent Craft Brewers Association.
 Midnight Sun Brewing Co. Official
 Top 50 Breweries in America

1995 establishments in Alaska
Beer brewing companies based in Alaska
Companies based in Anchorage, Alaska
Food and drink companies established in 1995